Skylines (stylized as SKYLIN3S, and also known as Skyline 3) is a 2020 American science fiction action film co-produced and directed by Liam O'Donnell which he wrote from a story he co-developed with producer Matthew E. Chausse. It is a sequel to Beyond Skyline (2017), and the third overall in the Skyline film series.

The film premiered at the London FrightFest film festival on October 25, 2020, and was released on December 18, 2020, in the United States in theaters and on Apple TV by Vertical Entertainment (all during the COVID-19 pandemic).

Plot

Picking up shortly after the previous film, Rose leads the human fleet against the aliens. Now called 'Harvesters', the aliens are onboard the Armada, a mother ship in orbit of the Moon. After breaking through the enemy lines, Rose freezes before she can fire and one of her ships is destroyed. With the aliens preparing to fire on Earth, Rose is forced to destroy one of her own ships when it gets into the crossfire. She sacrifices thousands of humans, but succeeds in destroying the Armada. Wracked with guilt, Rose vanishes while humanity rebuilds, living alongside billions of 'Pilots', freed alien-human hybrids.

Five years after the battle, Rose lives in a tent city near the ruins of London, avoiding resistance forces searching for her and keeping the aging effects of her hybrid nature at bay with the help of hyper-oxygenated blood transfusions prepared by her friend Dr. Mal. A viral pandemic strikes the Pilots and anyone using transplanted Pilot limbs. The virus eats the Pilots alive while reverting them back into their brainwashed state. Resistance leader Leon captures Rose and brings her before General Radford who reveals that the Armada's core drive warped to Cobalt One, the Harvester homeworld, before the ship's destruction. Only with the Armada's core drive do they have a chance of saving the Pilots. Rose reluctantly agrees to join the mission.

At Cobalt One, the team's ship crashes after a collision that leaves it running on emergency power. The crew of Rose, her Pilot adoptive brother Trent, Leon, Owens and Alexi find the planet filled with the bodies of dead Harvesters. There are also strange shadow creatures that appear to be mutations of the Harvesters. Alexi is heavily wounded and sacrifices herself with a pulse grenade to kill them. The team manages to reach the Armada where Rose is briefly possessed by the Harvester Matriarch, who accuses the humans of coming to destroy her species. Trent helps Rose to break free of the Matriarch's control and Rose realizes that the alien's telepathic influence was what caused her to freeze in the war. Now no longer afraid of who she is, Rose embraces her powers and steals the core drive. However, Owens betrays the others, infects Trent with the virus and flees with the core drive.

Rose and Leon later discover that Radford bombed Cobalt One prior to their arrival with a biological weapon, the same virus that is infecting the Pilots on Earth. As the two make their way back aboard the ship, Radford uses the core drive to destroy Cobalt One and the Harvesters in an act of genocide. He reveals to them that the virus was intended to peacefully euthanize the Pilots and destroy the Harvesters, but it had the unintended side effect of reverting the Pilots back into their brainwashed state. Having boarded the ship as well, the Matriarch kills Radford, intending to destroy the Earth in revenge. After realizing the truth about the virus, Owens attacks Zhi, who manages to fight him off. As the ship enters a wormhole, Owens falls into an energy field and is disintegrated. Trent, whom Leon manages to snap back to normal, knocks the Matriarch in as well, but has most of his body disintegrated in the process.

On Earth, Mal works on a cure, but the infected Pilots attack before she can finish testing it. The residents, including Mal, Kate, Grant and Huana, fight back and manage to eliminate the attacking Pilots at the cost of Grant and several others, only to have an army of thousands more approach from London. Arriving back just in the nick of time, Rose sucks all of the Pilots into her ship. With Mal's cure and her ship, they now have the power to cure all of the infected Pilots worldwide.

In the aftermath, Mal transplants Trent's brain into a new Pilot body, saving him. Zhi hacks into Radford's personal files and discovers the location of a prison where Radford had held anyone that he considered to be an enemy of the state, including Rose and Trent's long-missing father Mark Corley. Rose orders a course set for the prison, intending to rescue her adoptive father.

Cast
 Lindsey Morgan as Rose Corley, a super-powered captain of the survivors and daughter of the late Jarrod and Elaine.
 Jonathan Howard as Leon
 Daniel Bernhardt as Owens
 Rhona Mitra as Dr. Mal
 James Cosmo as Grant
 Alexander Siddig as General Radford
 Yayan Ruhian as Huana
 Ieva Andrejevaitė as Alexi
 Samantha Jean as Elaine
 Jeremy Fitzgerald as Trent Corley
 Giedre Mockeliunaite as Izzy
 Cha-Lee Yoon as Zhi
 Phong Giang as the Matriarch, the supreme ruler of the Harvesters and the one behind the events of the previous 2 films. 
 Naomi Tankel as Kate
 Rokas Spanlinskas as Violet
 Tony Black as Jarrod

Reception

Box office 
The film opened theatrically in Vietnam on December 11, and grossed $49,978 from 960 theaters in its opening weekend, ranking fifth with an average of $52 per theater. The film was pulled from 915 theaters in its second weekend, ranking eighth with $972 and a decrease of 98.1%.

Critical response 
On Metacritic, the film has a weighted average score of 46 out of 100, based on 4 critics, indicating "mixed or average reviews".

Sequel 
In December 2020, writer/director O'Donnell announced plans to continue the series, with intentions to bring back the principal cast. That same month, Frank Grillo expressed interest in reprising his role in the series. In May 2022, it was announced Screen Media had acquired the international rights to the fourth Skyline film, titled Skyline Radial. The film will be released in 2025.

References

External links
 
 

2020 films
2020 science fiction action films
American science fiction action films
American sequel films
2020s English-language films
Films about extraterrestrial life
Films set on fictional planets
Vertical Entertainment films
Alien invasions in films
2020s American films